Symphony No. 37 may refer to:

Symphony No. 37 (Haydn), composed by Joseph Haydn
Symphony No. 37 (Michael Haydn), composed by Michael Haydn in 1788
Symphony No. 37 (Mozart), composed by Wolfgang Amadeus Mozart in late 1783

037